Vinod Prasad Yadav is an Indian politician. He was elected to the Bihar Legislative Assembly from Sherghati as the 2010 Member of Bihar Legislative Assembly and a member of the Janata Dal (United).

References

1967 births
Living people
People from Gaya district
Janata Dal (United) politicians
Members of the Bihar Legislative Assembly